Senator Booth may refer to:

Hiram Booth (1860–1940), U.S. Senator from Utah from 1906 to 1914
James W. Booth (1822–1876), New York State Senate
Newton Booth (1825–1892), U.S Senator from California from 1875 to 1881

See also
Armistead L. Boothe (1907–1990), Virginia State Senate